The Panasonic Lumix 7-14mm 4  lens is a wide to ultra-wide angle zoom lens for Micro Four Thirds system cameras.  The hood is permanently attached, preventing the use of filters.

While reviewers praise its image quality and constant f/ratio despite a small size, it is considered very expensive, especially after the introduction of the competing, even smaller Olympus Olympus M.Zuiko Digital ED 9-18mm f/4-5.6 lens.

External links
 LUMIX G VARIO 7-14mm / F4.0 ASPH.

References

007-014